North Korea crisis or North Korean crisis may refer to:
Korean Missile Crisis (2013)
2017–18 North Korea crisis